Montreux-Vieux is a commune in the Haut-Rhin department and Grand Est region of north-eastern France.

People
 Hans Paetsch, German actor and speaker, born here

See also
 Communes of the Haut-Rhin département

References

Communes of Haut-Rhin